Alejandro Ulises Carrasco Orellana (born 23 March 1978) is a Chilean former footballer who played as a midfielder. 

His last club was Everton.

Club career
Born in Santiago, Carrasco began playing professional football with Audax Italiano. He helped the club earn promotion from the Chilean second division during the 1995 season. He would play for Audax Italiano in the Chilean first division over the next 7.5 seasons.

Carrasco moved to Greece in July 2003, joining Greek first division side Skoda Xanthi F.C., but played in only five league matches before leaving in December 2003.

He returned to Audax Italiano for the 2004 season, before moving to Chilean first division sides Colo-Colo, Deportes Melipilla, Santiago Wanderers and Palestino.

International career
He was called up to the Chile national team for the friendly matches against Turkey in 2002 and Costa Rica in 2003, but he didn't make his debut.

Personal life
He is known by his nickname Bocha.

Honours

Player
Palestino
 Primera División de Chile (1): Runner-up 2008 Clausura

References

External links

1978 births
Living people
Footballers from Santiago
Chilean footballers
Chilean expatriate footballers
Audax Italiano footballers
Xanthi F.C. players
Colo-Colo footballers
Deportes Melipilla footballers
Santiago Wanderers footballers
Club Deportivo Palestino footballers
San Luis de Quillota footballers
Everton de Viña del Mar footballers
Chilean Primera División players
Super League Greece players
Primera B de Chile players
Chilean expatriate sportspeople in Greece
Expatriate footballers in Greece
Association football midfielders